Gilbertsmithia is a genus of green algae in the family Scenedesmaceae. It was named after the American botanist Gilbert Morgan Smith.

References

External links

Sphaeropleales genera
Sphaeropleales